Jenny Richards may refer to:

Jenny Richards, a character from the 1970s British television series Survivors, played by Lucy Fleming
Jenny Richards, a character from the television series Howards' Way played by Charmian Gradwell
Jenny Richards, model and winner of the 2001 British reality show Model Behaviour